Grigore Popescu-Băjenaru (December 13, 1907 – February 5, 1986) was a Romanian writer. His best known novel is Cișmigiu et Comp., that presents his adventures as a student of Gheorghe Lazăr High School, situated near the Cișmigiu Gardens in central Bucharest, in the interwar period. It was a best-seller for several decades, and still popular among high school students. Its sequel is Bună dimineața, băieți!, presenting moments from his career as a teacher.

Life
He was born in Periș, near Bucharest. After attending high school, he studied literature and philosophy at the University of Bucharest. He worked as a teacher at several private and state schools, and later took administrative jobs at Bucharest City Hall, the Astronomical Observatory, and at the Art Gallery.

He died in Craiova.

Selected works
Novels:
 Cișmigiu et Comp., 1942
 Bună dimineața, băieți!, 1973 ("Good morning, boys!")
 Mici povestiri despre oameni mari, 1981 ("Short stories about great people")
Historical writings:
 Banul Mărăcine, 1967 ("Lord Brushwood")
 Inelul lui Dragoș-Vodă, 1968 ("The ring of Prince Dragoș")
 Taina lui Mircea Voievod, 1970
 Mărețul rege Burebista, 1980 ("Mighty king Burebista")
Collections of fairy tales and legends:
 Orologiul împăratului, 1957 ("The Emperor's clock")
 Vârful cu dor, 1973 ("Summit of Longing")
 Grădina înțelepților, 1975 ("Garden of the Wise Ones")

References
Grigore Băjenaru, crispedia.ro (in Romanian)
Romanul lăzăriștilor, tipărit cu banii pentru o mașină, jurnalul.ro (in Romanian)

People from Periș
Romanian male novelists
1907 births
1986 deaths
20th-century Romanian novelists
20th-century Romanian male writers
University of Bucharest alumni
Gheorghe Lazăr National College (Bucharest) alumni